"The Old Vicarage, Grantchester" is a light poem by the English Georgian poet Rupert Brooke (1887-1915), written while in Berlin in 1912. After initially titling the poem "Home" and then "The Sentimental Exile", the author eventually chose the name of his occasional residence near Cambridge. The poem's references can be overly obscure because of the many specific Cambridgeshire locations and English traditions to which the poem refers. Some have seen it as sentimentally nostalgic, which it is, while others have recognised its satiric and sometimes cruel humour.

Using octosyllabics—a meter often favored by Brooke—the author writes of Grantchester and other nearby villages in what has been called a seriocomic style. It is very much a poem of "place": the place where Brooke composed the work, Berlin and the Café des Westens, and the contrast of that German world ("Here am I, sweating, sick, and hot") with his home in England. Yet it is more than just the longing of an exile for his home, nostalgically imagined. The landscape of Cambridgeshire is reproduced in the poem, but Brooke, the academic, populates this English world with allusions and references from history and myth. He compares the countryside to a kind of Greek Arcadia, home to nymphs and fauns, and refers to such famous literary figures as Lord Byron, Geoffrey Chaucer, and Tennyson. Homesick for England, a land "Where men with Splendid Hearts may go", it is Grantchester, in particular, that he desires.

Text
Source:The Complete Poems of Rupert Brooke (Sidwick & Jackson, Ltd, London, 1934), p. 93. 
The Old Vicarage, Grantchester

(Cafe des Westens, Berlin, May 1912)

Just now the lilac is in bloom,
All before my little room;
And in my flower-beds, I think,
Smile the carnation and the pink;
And down the borders, well I know,
The poppy and the pansy blow . . .
Oh! there the chestnuts, summer through,
Beside the river make for you
A tunnel of green gloom, and sleep
Deeply above; and green and deep
The stream mysterious glides beneath,
Green as a dream and deep as death.
-- Oh, damn!  I know it! and I know
How the May fields all golden show,
And when the day is young and sweet,
Gild gloriously the bare feet
That run to bathe . . .
                      Du lieber Gott!

Here am I, sweating, sick, and hot,
And there the shadowed waters fresh
Lean up to embrace the naked flesh.
Temperamentvoll German Jews
Drink beer around; -- and there the dews
Are soft beneath a morn of gold.
Here tulips bloom as they are told;
Unkempt about those hedges blows
An English unofficial rose;
And there the unregulated sun
Slopes down to rest when day is done,
And wakes a vague unpunctual star,
A slippered Hesper; and there are
Meads towards Haslingfield and Coton
Where das Betreten's not verboten.

εἴθε γενοίμην. . . would I were 
In Grantchester, in Grantchester! --
Some, it may be, can get in touch
With Nature there, or Earth, or such.
And clever modern men have seen
A Faun a-peeping through the green,
And felt the Classics were not dead,
To glimpse a Naiad's reedy head,
Or hear the Goat-foot piping low: . . .
But these are things I do not know.
I only know that you may lie
Day long and watch the Cambridge sky,
And, flower-lulled in sleepy grass,
Hear the cool lapse of hours pass,
Until the centuries blend and blur
In Grantchester, in Grantchester. . . .
Still in the dawnlit waters cool
His ghostly Lordship swims his pool,
And tries the strokes, essays the tricks,
Long learnt on Hellespont, or Styx.
Dan Chaucer hears his river still
Chatter beneath a phantom mill.
Tennyson notes, with studious eye,
And in that garden, black and white,
Creep whispers through the grass all night;
And spectral dance, before the dawn,
A hundred Vicars down the lawn;
Curates, long dust, will come and go
On lissom, clerical, printless toe;
And oft between the boughs is seen
The sly shade of a Rural Dean . . .
Till, at a shiver in the skies,
Vanishing with Satanic cries,
The prim ecclesiastic rout
Leaves but a startled sleeper-out,
Grey heavens, the first bird's drowsy calls,
The falling house that never falls.

God!  I will pack, and take a train,
And get me to England once again!
For England's the one land, I know,
Where men with Splendid Hearts may go;
And Cambridgeshire, of all England,
The shire for Men who Understand;
And of that district I prefer
The lovely hamlet Grantchester.
For Cambridge people rarely smile,
Being urban, squat, and packed with guile;
And Royston men in the far South
Are black and fierce and strange of mouth;
At Over they fling oaths at one,
And worse than oaths at Trumpington,
And Ditton girls are mean and dirty,
And there's none in Harston under thirty,
And folks in Shelford and those parts
Have twisted lips and twisted hearts,
And Barton men make Cockney rhymes,
And Coton's full of nameless crimes,
And things are done you'd not believe
At Madingley on Christmas Eve.
Strong men have run for miles and miles,
When one from Cherry Hinton smiles;
Strong men have blanched, and shot their wives,
Rather than send them to St. Ives;
Strong men have cried like babes, bydam,
To hear what happened at Babraham.
But Grantchester! ah, Grantchester!
There's peace and holy quiet there,
Great clouds along pacific skies,
And men and women with straight eyes,
Lithe children lovelier than a dream,
A bosky wood, a slumbrous stream,
And little kindly winds that creep
Round twilight corners, half asleep.
In Grantchester their skins are white;
They bathe by day, they bathe by night;
The women there do all they ought;
The men observe the Rules of Thought.
They love the Good; they worship Truth;
They laugh uproariously in youth;
(And when they get to feeling old,
They up and shoot themselves, I'm told) . . .

Ah God! to see the branches stir
Across the moon at Grantchester!
To smell the thrilling-sweet and rotten
Unforgettable, unforgotten
River-smell, and hear the breeze
Sobbing in the little trees.
Say, do the elm-clumps greatly stand
Still guardians of that holy land?
The chestnuts shade, in reverend dream,
The yet unacademic stream?
Is dawn a secret shy and cold
Anadyomene, silver-gold?
And sunset still a golden sea
From Haslingfield to Madingley?
And after, ere the night is born,
Do hares come out about the corn?
Oh, is the water sweet and cool,
Gentle and brown, above the pool?
And laughs the immortal river still
Under the mill, under the mill?
Say, is there Beauty yet to find?
And Certainty? and Quiet kind?
Deep meadows yet, for to forget
The lies, and truths, and pain? . . . oh! yet
Stands the Church clock at ten to three?
And is there honey still for tea?

Culture and legacy
John Betjeman reuses εἴθε γενοίμην ("") in his poem "The Olympic Girl":

Eithe genoimen … would I were,
(Forgive me shade of Rupert Brooke)
An object fit to claim her look,
Oh! Would I were a racket press'd,
With hard excitement to her breast!

(John Betjeman, first published in A Few Late Chrysanthemums, 1954)

Charles Ives set a portion of the poem to music in 1921; the piece is 15 bars long.

Ian Moncrieffe concludes his epilogue to W. Stanley Moss's Ill Met by Moonlight with extracts from a wartime letter written to him by Patrick Leigh Fermor from a Greek valley, where he was engaged in guerrilla operations against the Nazi invaders.  PLF ended his letter with the words έίθε γενοίμην.  He wishes that he and IM could be together, at one or other of their firesides, enjoying one another's company rather than relying on erratic correspondence during a time of hostilities. IM starts his epilogue with another quotation from Brooke's "Menelaus and Helen",  and one might conclude that quoting from Brooke was a vogue pastime for the band of well-educated young officers based in Egypt, whose best-known exploit was the capture of a German general in Crete in the spring of 1944, and successfully taking him off the island to Alexandria (the subject of Moss's book).

A 1975 episode of the Croft and Perry BBC sitcom Dad's Army is titled Is There Honey Still for Tea?

In the 1941 movie "Pimpernel" Smith, Leslie Howard's titular character recites a piece of this poem ("God! I will pack, and take a train, And get me to England once again! For England's the one land, I know, Where men with Splendid Hearts may go") and refers to Brooke in the scene.

The final two lines of the poem are paraphrased by Doremus Jessop in Sinclair Lewis' novel It Can't Happen Here.

The comedy sketch Balham, Gateway to the South, written by Frank Muir and Denis Norden, ends with a verse by "C. Quills Smith, Balham's own bard". In a few stanzas the "bard" manages to plagiarise or mangle the work of several real poets, and ends with the last two lines of Brooke's poem.

Iris Murdoch's novel An Unofficial Rose, published in 1962, takes its title from a line of this poem.

References

External links
 Memoir by Edward Marsh (Brooke's literary executor) including Brooke's letter to Geoffrey Fry, 1911, describing his feelings about being parted from England and Cambridge.

1912 poems
Grantchester